Stuart Carter (born 31 October 1958) is an Australian former rowing coxswain. He was a ten-time national champion and a representative at world championships and Olympics. In 1976 still aged seventeen and in his final year of school, he coxed Sydney Rowing Club crews to three state titles in a pair, four and eight and to two national titles in a pair and a four; coxed the New South Wales representative eight to a King's Cup victory; and coxed the Australian men's eight at the 1976 Summer Olympics.

Club and state rowing
Carter was educated at Newington College in Sydney, coxed that school's first VIII in 1975 and was coached by his future club and representative coach Michael Morgan. In 1975 both the entire Newington and the  Riverview first VIIIs were selected as New South Wales' #1 and #2 youth eights to contest the Noel Wilkinson Trophy at the Interstate Regatta within the Australian Rowing Championships. Carter coxed the New South Wales #2 crew to second place behind a Geelong College eight racing as Victoria's state entrant. In 1976, in his final year of school Carter joined the Sydney Rowing Club and picked up the ropes in the club's senior eight and its champion coxed four.

He steered the Sydney coxed four to a state title and a national championship win in 1976, and then successfully defended that same national title in 1977 1978 and 1979. In 1976 he was under the bow of a Sydney coxed pairing of Stephen Handley and Simon Dean who rowed to a national championship title. In 1977 he steered a composite pair of Dean and Mosman's Chris Shinners to a second place. In 1978 and 1979 he coxed an SRC pairing of Handley and Islay Lee to consecutive national titles.

Carter made senior state selection for New South Wales in 1976 in the men's eight which contested and won the King's Cup at the Interstate Regatta. In 1977 and 1978 he was again in the stern of the New South Wales's eights who successfully defended their King's Cup titles.

International representative rowing
Carter was still aged seventeen when in 1976 he won state and national titles in every heavyweight coxed boat class and was the youngest ever coxswain selected to an Australian Olympic eight. The crew for the  1976 Montreal Olympics was mostly that year's King's Cup winning New South Wales crew excepting Malcolm Shaw in the two seat and Brian Richardson at bow. They commenced their Olympic campaign with a heat win in a new world record time and progressed to the final. In the heat Shaw suffered a severe back injury (a collapsed vertebra) which saw him out of the eight and replaced by Peter Shakespear, the reserve. In the final the Australians finished fifth. 

Mosman's Terry O'Hanlon coxed the Australian eight at the 1977 World Rowing Championships but for the 1978 World Rowing Championships in Lake Karapiro, the successful New South King's Cup eight was again selected with Carter in the stern and composed of all Sydney men excepting Mosman's Gary Uebergang and Athol MacDonald. The Australian eight placed second in their heat, third in the repechage and in the final finished fourth being edged out for third by the host nation New Zealand.

References

External links

1958 births
Living people
Australian male rowers
Olympic rowers of Australia
Rowers at the 1976 Summer Olympics
Place of birth missing (living people)
People educated at Newington College
Coxswains (rowing)
Sportsmen from New South Wales
Rowers from Sydney